The sports club Ankara University is a professional men's and women's ice hockey team from Ankara, Turkey. The men's team participated in the Turkish Hockey SuperLig (TBHSL) for the first time in the season (2009–2010), and became champion.

The women's team plays in Group A in the Turkish Ice Hockey Women's League

Men's team

Season-by-season record
Turkish Ice Hockey Super League

Men’s roster (2009-2010)

Women's team

Women’s roster (2009-2010)

References

Ice hockey teams in Turkey
Turkish Ice Hockey Super League teams
Sports teams in Ankara
Ankara University
Turkish Ice Hockey Women's League teams
Student sport in Turkey